Mel Tolkin ( Shmuel Tolchinsky; August 3, 1913 – November 26, 2007) was a television comedy writer best known as head writer of the live sketch comedy series Your Show of Shows (NBC, 1950–1954) during the Golden Age of Television. There he presided over a staff that at times included Mel Brooks, Neil Simon, and Danny Simon. The writers' room inspired the film My Favorite Year (1982), produced by Brooks, and the Broadway play Laughter on the 23rd Floor (1993), written by Neil Simon.

Tolkin, who won an Emmy Award and every other major prize for television writing, was the father of screenwriter-novelist Michael Tolkin and TV writer-director Stephen Tolkin.

Biography

Early life and career 
Mel Tolkin was born Shmuel Tolchinsky  (means "from Tuľčyn") in a Jewish shtetl near Odessa, Ukraine, then part of the Russian Empire, the son of Nessie (Cartman) and Mendel "Max" Tolchinsky, a labourer and door-to-door salesman. 

A background of anti-Semitic pogroms, shared by other comedy writers of his generation, he noted in 1992, "I'm not happy to have to say ... created the condition where humor becomes anger made acceptable with a joke".

His family moved to Montreal, Quebec, Canada in 1926, where Tolkin became known as Samuel. He studied accounting after graduating from high school, and surreptitiously entered show business by composing songs and sketches for local revues and playing piano in jazz clubs. Fearing his parents would disapprove of what they would see as an impractical career choice, he began using the pseudonym Mel Tolkin.

During World War II, Tolkin did military service in the Canadian Army, playing the glockenspiel in a military orchestra. He moved to New York City, New York, in 1946, and married Edith Leibovitch that year. Teaming with Lucille Kallen, who would become his longtime writing partner, Tolkin began concocting comedy for performers at the Poconos resort Camp Tamiment. In 1949, the duo became the sole writing staff of the NBC television network variety show The Admiral Broadway Revue. By the following year, that series, starring Sid Caesar and Imogene Coca, had evolved into Your Show of Shows.

Your Show of Shows
Considered by TV historians as a classic of the medium, with Ronald C. Simon, television curator of The Paley Center for Media calling it "a pinnacle of television history", the series presented 90 minutes of comedy live each week for 39 weeks a year, for a total of 160 shows airing February 25, 1950, to June 5, 1954. From its sixth-floor office on West 56th Street in Manhattan, writers including Mel Brooks, Neil Simon, Danny Simon, Larry Gelbart, and Lucille Kallen. 

Tolkin, famously fought, argued, quipped, crafted, "paced, muttered, swore, occasionally typed and more than occasionally threw things: crumpled paper cups, cigars (lighted) and much else. The acoustical-tile ceiling was fringed with pencils, which had been flung aloft in a rage and stuck fast; Mr. Tolkin once counted 39 of them suspended there".

The series quickly settled into a starring quartet of Caesar, Coca, Carl Reiner and Howard Morris. Many of its sketches became classics that found a new audience beginning in 1973, when the show's producer-director, Max Liebman, compiled the theatrical film release 10 From Your Show of Shows. Tolkin continued writing on an acclaimed successor series, Caesar's Hour, which ran September 27, 1954 through 1957. He also wrote the theme song for Your Show of Shows, "Stars Over Broadway".

Later life and career
Tolkin wrote for the 1968–1970 CBS situation comedy The Good Guys (which starred Bob Denver, Herb Edelman, and Joyce Van Patten). For six years in the 1970s, he was a story editor for the landmark CBS sitcom All in the Family, writing several of its scripts. He also wrote for the sequel series Archie Bunker's Place, and for the 1981–1983 Tony Randall sitcom Love, Sidney.

Tolkin died of heart failure at age 94, at his home in Century City, California. Aside from children and grandchildren, he was survived by his wife, Edith, and by a brother, Sol Tolchinsky. He was interred at Hillside Memorial Park Cemetery in Los Angeles, California.

Other writing
Tolkin also wrote comedy for the standup comics and nightclub entertainers Bob Hope, Jerry Lewis, Danny Kaye, and Danny Thomas, who later became stars.

Awards
Tolkin and co-writers Sam Denoff, Bill Persky, and Carl Reiner shared the 1967 Outstanding Writing Achievement in Variety Emmy Award, for The Sid Caesar, Imogene Coca, Carl Reiner, Howard Morris Special.

Tolkin also received the following Emmy nominations:
Best Comedy Writing - 1956
for Caesar's Hour (NBC), shared with Mel Brooks, Selma Diamond, Larry Gelbart, and Sheldon Keller
Best Comedy Writing - Variety Or Situation Comedy - 1957
for Caesar's Hour (NBC), shared with Gary Belkin, Mel Brooks, Larry Gelbart, Sheldon Keller, Neil Simon, and Mike Stewart
Best Comedy Writing - 1958
for Caesar's Hour (NBC), shared with Gary Belkin, Mel Brooks, Larry Gelbart,Sheldon Keller, Neil Simon, and Mike Stewart
Outstanding Writing Achievement in Comedy or Variety - 1964
The Danny Kaye Show (CBS), shared with Herbert Baker, Gary Belkin, Ernest Chambers, Larry Gelbart, Saul Ilson, Sheldon Keller, Paul Mazursky, and Larry Tucker
 
With writing partner Larry Rhine, Tolkin shared a 1978 Humanitas Prize for 30 Minute Network or Syndicated Television, for the All in the Family episode "The Brother". Rhine and Tolkin also shared a 1977 nomination in that category, for the All in the Family episode "Archie's Brief Encounter - Part II".

Tolkin also received four Writers Guild of America Awards and two additional nominations:
1965: Television: Variety: Series or Special: Musical or Comedy
The Danny Kaye Show (1963-64), shared with Herbert Baker, Sheldon Keller, Saul Ilson, Ernest Chambers, Gary Belkin, Paul Mazursky, and Larry Tucker
1966: Television: Variety: Series or Special: Musical or Comedy
The Danny Kaye Show with Art Carney, shared with Sheldon Keller, Gary Belkin, Ernest Chambers, Larry Tucker, Paul Mazursky, Billy Barnes, and Ron Friedman
1968: Television: Variety: Series or Special: Musical or Comedy
'The Sid Caesar, Imogene Coca, Carl Reiner, Howard Morris Special, shared with Mel Brooks, Sam Denoff, William Persky, and Carl Reiner
1978: Television: Episodic ComedyAll in the Family ("Archie Gets the Business - Parts I & II"), shared with Larry Rhine
Nominations
1966: Television: Variety: Series or Special: Musical or ComedyThe Danny Kaye Show with Fred Gwynne, shared with Sheldon Keller, Gary Belkin, Ernest Chambers, Larry Tucker, Paul Mazursky, Billy Barnes, and Ron Friedman
1977 Television: Episodic Comedy All in the Family ("oey's Baptism"), shared with Larry Rhine and Milt Josefsberg

Tolkin also received a Peabody Award.

Legacy
The Your Show of Shows writers' room inspired the film My Favorite Year (1982), produced by Brooks, and the Broadway play Laughter on the 23rd Floor'' (1993), written by Neil Simon.

References

External links
 
 

1913 births
2007 deaths
American comedy writers
Jewish Canadian writers
Emmy Award winners
Writers Guild of America Award winners
Ukrainian emigrants to Canada
Soviet emigrants to Canada
Canadian people of Ukrainian-Jewish descent
Canadian emigrants to the United States
American people of Ukrainian-Jewish descent
Odesa Jews
People from Odessky Uyezd
Jewish American writers
20th-century American Jews
21st-century American Jews